The Turkish Basketball Championship was a top-level basketball championship competition in Turkey, that was run by the Turkish Basketball Federation, from 1946 to 1967. In the 1966–67 season, the competition was replaced by the Turkish Basketball Super League (BSL).

The Basketball Super League (BSL), also known as the ING Basketbol Süper Ligi for sponsorship reasons, is the top men's professional basketball division of the Turkish basketball league system. It replaced the former Turkish Basketball Championship (1946–1967) to become the Turkish Basketball League (TBL) until 2015 when it adopted its current name while the TBL name became exclusive to the second-tier and third-tier divisions.

Title holders

Turkish Basketball Championship
 1946 Beykoz
 1947 Galatasaray
 1948 Galatasaray
 1949 Galatasaray
 1950 Galatasaray
 1951 Harp Okulu
 1952 Harp Okulu
 1953 Galatasaray
 1954 Modaspor
 1955 Galatasaray & Modaspor 
 1956 Galatasaray
 1957 Fenerbahçe
 1958 Modaspor
 1959 Fenerbahçe
 1960 Galatasaray
 1961 Darüşşafaka
 1962 Darüşşafaka
 1963 Galatasaray
 1964 Galatasaray
 1965 Fenerbahçe
 1966 Galatasaray
 1967 Altınordu 
Basketball Super League
 1966–67 Altınordu
 1967–68 İTÜ
 1968–69 Galatasaray

 1969–70 İTÜ
 1970–71 İTÜ
 1971–72 İTÜ
 1972–73 İTÜ
 1973–74 Muhafızgücü
 1974–75 Beşiktaş
 1975–76 Eczacıbaşı
 1976–77 Eczacıbaşı
 1977–78 Eczacıbaşı
 1978–79 Efes Pilsen
 1979–80 Eczacıbaşı
 1980–81 Eczacıbaşı
 1981–82 Eczacıbaşı
 1982–83 Efes Pilsen
 1983–84 Efes Pilsen
 1984–85 Galatasaray
 1985–86 Galatasaray
 1986–87 Karşıyaka
 1987–88 Eczacıbaşı
 1988–89 Eczacıbaşı
 1989–90 Galatasaray
 1990–91 Fenerbahçe
 1991–92 Efes Pilsen
 1992–93 Efes Pilsen
 1993–94 Efes Pilsen
 1994–95 Ülker
 1995–96 Efes Pilsen

 1996–97 Efes Pilsen
 1997–98 Ülker
 1998–99 Tofaş
 1999–00 Tofaş
 2000–01 Ülker
 2001–02 Efes Pilsen
 2002–03 Efes Pilsen
 2003–04 Efes Pilsen
 2004–05 Efes Pilsen
 2005–06 Ülker
 2006–07 Fenerbahçe Ülker
 2007–08 Fenerbahçe Ülker
 2008–09 Efes Pilsen
 2009–10 Fenerbahçe Ülker 
 2010–11 Fenerbahçe Ülker 
 2011–12 Beşiktaş Milangaz
 2012–13 Galatasaray Medical Park
 2013–14 Fenerbahçe Ülker
 2014–15 Pınar Karşıyaka 
 2015–16 Fenerbahçe 
 2016–17 Fenerbahçe
 2017–18 Fenerbahçe Doğuş
 2018–19 Anadolu Efes
 2019–20 Cancelled due to the COVID-19 pandemic.
 2020–21 Anadolu Efes
 2021–22 Fenerbahçe Beko

Performance by club
Clubs in bold currently play in the top division.

1955 two domestic champions
On April 25, 1955, the last game of the championship was Fenerbahçe against Galatasaray at Spor Sergi Sarayı. Galatasaray and Modaspor were in the championship race until the last game and they had the same number of points. Therefore, the last game was very important for both Galatasaray and Modaspor since the champion would be determined by total point difference. In the game against Galatasaray, Fenerbahçe officials withdrew their team from the match with just 44 seconds left to the end of the match due to Fenerbahçe being behind by 13 points, with no chance of turning the game. Thus the match could not be concluded. Nevertheless, the Federation of Sports declared that such behavior of the Fenerbahçe officials would not be acceptable and there were two domestic champions, Galatasaray and Modaspor, in that year. The trophy was split into two pieces and both clubs could keep these in their museums.

Final ranking

Pos.=Position, Pld=Matches played, W=Matches won, D=Draws, L=Matches lost, PF=Points for, PA=Points against, PD=Points difference

1967 Turkish Basketball Championship
1967 season was the last season of Turkish Basketball Championship in Turkey before Basketball Super League. The tournament was organized by the Turkish Basketball Federation (TBF) to select a club that would represent Turkey in the 1967–68 FIBA European Champions Cup. The championship was played between champion of 1966-67 Basketball Super League Altınordu and winner of 1966-67 Turkish Basketball Cup Fenerbahçe. Altınordu won the championship by winning two matches against Fenerbahçe.

Notes

References

 Atabeyoğlu, Cem. 1453-1991 Türk Spor Tarihi Ansiklopedisi. page(557).(1991) An Grafik Basın Sanayi ve Ticaret AŞ
 Milliyet Newspaper Archive April 26, 1955
 Durupınar, Mehmet. Türk Basketbolunun 100 Yıllık Tarihi (2009).sf (48). Efes Pazarlama ve Dağıtım Ticaret A.Ş. 

League 1
 
1946 establishments in Turkey
1967 disestablishments in Turkey
Basketball